King Cobb Steelie is a Canadian indie rock band formed in 1991 from Guelph, Ontario, and later based in Toronto.  The band's most successful single was 1997's "Rational", from the album Junior Relaxer. Their music fuses elements of punk, grunge, funk, jazz and dance. The core of the band is singer/songwriter Kevan Byrne and bassist Kevin Lynn. A variety of other collaborators, including Sam Cino, Al Okada, Gary Dutch, Geoff Walton, Steve Clarkson, Mike Armstrong, Nathan Lawr, Don Pyle and Michelle McAdorey, have contributed to individual albums.

History

In 1993 the band, named for a special kind of toy marble, released its self-titled album, which fused progressive rock with dubstep sampling. In 1994 the band was signed to the EMI label, and released the followup album Project Twinkle. The album received a Juno Award nomination for Alternative Album of the Year at the Juno Awards of 1995.

Following Project Twinkle, the band also performed a number of improvisational shows under the pseudonym Junior Relaxer, which would become the title of their third album in 1997. The album's lead single, "Rational", was the band's biggest hit, and garnered the band a MuchMusic Video Award nomination for Best Video at the 1997 MMVAs.

In 1999, as Junior Relaxer, the band gave a number of performances at Rancho Relaxo in Toronto.

Percussionist Robin Easton participated as drummer 14 in the Boredoms 77 Boadrum performance which occurred on July 7, 2007 at the Empire-Fulton Ferry State Park in Brooklyn, New York. That year King Cobb Steelie released an album, Destroy All Codes.

After several years of only occasional activity, the band played a 20th anniversary benefit show at Lee's Palace in Toronto, Ontario on April 16, 2011 with proceeds going towards Ontario Hands & Voices, an organisation dedicated to supporting families with children who are deaf or hard of hearing.

On December 12, 2013 King Cobb Steelie released Goodbye Arcadia, a four-track EP. This was their first new material in nine years. That year they performed a concert in Toronto as part of the Long Winter concert series.

In April 2022, member Mike Armstrong passed away from a cardiac event.

Discography
 One's a Heifer b/w Duotang (1991)
 King Cobb Steelie (1993)
 Project Twinkle (1994)
 Junior Relaxer (1997)
 Mayday (2000)
 Destroy All Codes (2004)
 Goodbye Arcadia EP (2013)

See also

Music of Canada
Canadian rock
List of Canadian musicians
List of bands from Canada
:Category:Canadian musical groups

References

External links

http://www.kingcobbsteelie.net/

Musical groups established in 1991
Canadian indie rock groups
Musical groups from Guelph
1991 establishments in Ontario
Canadian grunge groups